Appenzell is a former Swiss canton.

Appenzell or Appenzeller may also refer to:

Places in Switzerland
Appenzell (village), a village in Switzerland and the capital of Appenzell Innerrhoden
Appenzell Ausserrhoden (Appenzell Outer-Rhodes), a canton
Appenzell Innerrhoden (Appenzell Inner-Rhodes), a canton
Appenzell District, the district and municipality of Appenzell
Appenzellerland, the geographical and cultural territory covered by Appenzell Ausserrhoden and Appenzell Innerrhoden

Animals
Appenzeller Spitzhauben, a breed of chicken
Appenzell goat, a breed of goat
Appenzeller Sennenhund, a breed of dog

Other
the people of Appenzell
Appenzeller (cheese)
Appenzell Creek, a tributary of McMichael Creek in Pennsylvania, U.S.
"Appenzeller", a yodeling standard; see Appenzeller string music
Benedictus Appenzeller, composer of the Renaissance

See also